Herman Dooyeweerd (7 October 1894, Amsterdam – 12 February 1977, Amsterdam) was a professor of law and jurisprudence at the Vrije Universiteit, Amsterdam from 1926 to 1965. He was also a philosopher and principal founder of Reformational philosophy with Dirk Vollenhoven, a significant development within the Neocalvinist (or Kuyperian) school of thought. Dooyeweerd made several contributions to philosophy and other academic disciplines concerning the nature of diversity and coherence in everyday experience, the transcendental conditions for theoretical thought, the relationship between religion, philosophy, and scientific theory, and an understanding of meaning, being, time and self.

Dooyeweerd is most famous for his suite of fifteen aspects (or 'modalities', 'modal aspects', or 'modal law-spheres'), which are distinct ways in which reality exists, has meaning, is experienced, and occurs.  This suite of aspects is finding application in practical analysis, research and teaching in such diverse fields as built environment, sustainability, agriculture, business, information systems and development. Danie Strauss, the editor of Dooyeweerd's Collected Works, has provided a systematic look at Dooyeweerd's philosophy here.

Dooyeweerd’s critiques of philosophy
Dooyeweerd made both immanent and transcendental critiques of Western philosophy, following the traditions of Continental philosophy.

In his immanent critique, he sought to understand each philosophic thinker's work or each tradition from the inside, and uncover, in its own terms, its basic presuppositions, to reveal deep problems.  By such immanent critique of philosophic thinkers from the pre-Socratic Greeks onwards through to the middle of the twentieth century (including mediaeval period, into the modern periods), Dooyeweerd claimed to have demonstrated that theoretical thinking has always been based on presuppositions of a religious nature, which he called ground motives.  A ground motive is a spiritual driving force that impels each thinker to interpret reality under its influence. Dooyeweerd identified four major ground-motives of Western thought, three of them dualistic in nature:
 the Form-Matter divide of Greek thought
 the Creation-Fall-Redemption motive of Biblical (Hebrew, Semitic) thought
 the Nature-Grace divide of mediaeval, Scholastic thought
 the Nature-Freedom divide of humanistic, Enlightenment thought

This means that theoretical thought never has been neutral or autonomous of the thinker.

However, Dooyeweerd remained unsatisfied "with an argument that shows that in fact philosophy always has been influenced by religious convictions".  Rather, "He wants to show that it cannot be otherwise, because it is part of the nature of philosophy or theoretical thought."

This led Dooyeweerd to undertake a transcendental critique of theoretical thought, of the kind Immanuel Kant pioneered.  Whereas Kant and Husserl sought the conditions that make theoretical thinking possible, they still presupposed that a theoretical attitude is possible.  Dooyeweerd sought to understand the conditions that make a theoretical attitude possible, and argued that all theoretical thought takes place with reference to an "Origin of Meaning", which is a ground-motive to which we adhere extra-rationally.  This means that theoretical thought never can be neutral or autonomous of the thinker.

From this, Dooyeweerd argued that all "good" philosophy addresses three fundamental parts to an idea: 
 world
 coherence of rationalities
 origin of meaning

This, he proposed, can enable disparate theoretical and philosophical approaches to enter into discourse with each other, as long as each thinker openly admits their own ground-motive.  Dooyeweerd, accordingly, made very explicit his own grounding in Creation-Fall-Redemption, with a neo-Calvinist flavour and a debt to Abraham Kuyper.

Dooyeweerd's cosmonomic philosophy
Dooyeweerd's cosmonomic philosophy is different from most extant philosophy in at least three ways, which intertwine:

First, it takes seriously the pre-theoretical attitude of thought, as a starting point from which to begin to understand what makes theoretical thought possible.  Most other philosophical thinking begins by presupposing a theoretical attitude and either ignores everyday experience or attempts to explain it theoretically, either way presupposing the possibility of theoretical thought as a way to knowledge.  In making the possibility of theoretical thought a philosophical problem to address, Dooyeweerd went deeper and further than Kant, Husserl and Heidegger and others.

Second, it is rooted in different presuppositions ('ground motives') about the nature of reality, which are religious in nature.  Whereas Greek philosophy is rooted in the Form/Matter divide, Scholastic thinking of medieval Christianity in the Nature/Grace divide, and Humanistic philosophy in the Nature/Freedom divide, Dooyeweerd began from the Biblical idea of Creation Fall and Redemption.  He may be said to have explored the philosophical (rather than theological) implications of this idea.  He called his philosophy 'Christian philosophy', though what usually claims that label is of a Scholastic nature and very different.

Third, it posits that Meaning is more fundamental than Being or Process.  Dooyeweerd expressed it:

Meaningfulness originates from the Creator (God) rather than from sovereign human attribution.  All things, not just those linked with humanity, are meaningful.  Strictly, Dooyeweerd says, things are, rather than have, Meaning.  Thus, Meaning is like an ocean in which we swim, an enabler of all our existence and functioning, rather than a property we attribute to things or words.

Diversity of science
This has implications for science.  Science – whether mathematical, natural, human or social sciences - is seen as the abstracting of certain aspects for study.  For example, even though a lawyer and a biologist might study the same things (say, fingerprints), they are interested in different aspects.  They are looking at the meaning of a thing with different focus, though equally concerned with what is real. Perceptions of reality through this kind of scientific attitude, selecting one aspect as distinct from others for study, will necessarily be governed by fundamental assumptions about how these various kinds of meaning are related to one another in a coherent whole, belonging within the total range of all experiences.

Likewise, in everyday life, we can be aware of distinct aspects, though most of the time we function in them tacitly.

Aspects
The positing of meaning as fundamental, and the priority given to our pre-theoretical experience of diverse meaning, prompts the thinker to ask, what ways are there of being meaningful, which cannot be reduced to each other?  What different aspects are there of things?  He delineated fifteen, which are not mere categories, but modalities (ways of being, functioning, etc.):
 Quantitative aspect: amount
 Spatial aspect: continuous extension
 Kinematic aspect: flowing movement
 Physical aspect: energy, matter
 Biotic/Organic aspect: life functions, self-maintenance
 Sensitive/Psychic aspect: feeling and response
 Analytical aspect: distinction, conceptualization
 Formative aspect: formative power, achievement, technology, technique
 Lingual aspect: symbolic communication
 Social aspect: social interaction
 Economic aspect: frugal use of resources
 Aesthetic aspect: harmony, surprise, fun
 Juridical aspect: due (rights, responsibility)
 Ethical aspect: self-giving love
 Pistic aspect: faith, vision, commitment, belief

Dooyeweerd claimed that since the discovery of these is addressed by our theoretical functioning, which is fallible, no suite of aspects, including his own, can "lay claim to material completion".

Implications of the aspects
Briefly, aspects are ways of being meaningful and are the 'law side' of created reality.  All that occurs does so by 'answering to' the laws of each aspect (i.e. being subject to their laws).  e.g. physical waves or particles occur by the laws of the physical aspect, poetry occurs by the laws of the aesthetic aspect.  Thus, each aspect or 'law sphere' may be seen as defining a distinct kind of possibility.

Earlier aspects are determinative; later ones are normative.  Human beings function as subject in or to all aspects, animals as subject up to the sensitive aspect, plants up to the biotic, and non-living things up to the physical.  As you are reading this, you are functioning lingually by understanding it, analytically by conceptualizing, sensitively by seeing or hearing, etc.  In fact, all our functioning is multi-aspectual, though some aspects might be latent.

Things exist by reference to each aspect.  For example, a car exists physically as a load of steel, plastic, etc., kinematically as a mode of transport, socially as a status symbol, economically as a dent in our finances, aesthetically as a thing of beauty, biotically as a polluter, pistically as an idol, and so on.  The being of things is multi-aspectual in principle.

Knowledge may be seen as multi-aspectual knowing.  For example, analytical knowing gives categories and theories, formative knowing gives skills, lingual knowing gives 'bodies of knowledge' as found in libraries, and so on.

Each aspect defines a different rationality.  In this way, Dooyeweerd echoes Winch and Habermas, though with more precision.

Works and legacy 
Dooyeweerd attempted to provide a philosophy which accounted for not only the differences in non-human reality, but also, between one thinker and another.  Following Abraham Kuyper, and other, earlier Neo-Calvinists, Dooyeweerd attempted to describe reality as a creation of God, which has its meaning from God.  This God-given meaning is displayed in all of the aspects of temporal reality – which has implications for science.

For example, even though a lawyer and a biologist might study the same things (say, fingerprints), they are interested in different aspects. They are looking at the meaning of a thing with different focus, though equally concerned with what is real.  Perceptions of reality through this kind of scientific attitude, selecting one aspect as distinct from others for study, will necessarily be governed by fundamental assumptions about how these various kinds of meaning are related to one another in a coherent whole, belonging within the total range of all experiences.  Dooyeweerd argued that this showed the need for a consistent and radically Christian philosophy which he sought to provide.  Furthermore, he attempted to show that even the imaginations of men are part of that same created reality, and even where misguided they cannot escape being subject to the rule of God exposed by the Christian revelation.

Dooyeweerd self-consciously allowed his Christian perspective to guide his understanding, but in a philosophical rather than a theological mode of thought.  He believed that this permitted the philosopher to gain insight into the principle by which diversity of meaning is held together as a unity, as he directs his thought toward the origin of things, which is God, and God's purpose for making things, which is found in Christ.  This basic religious orientation should affect the way that the Christian understands things.  In contrast to a dualistic type of religious ground motive, Dooyeweerd suggested that the Christian's basic orientation to the world ought to be derived not from human speculation, but from God's revealed purposes: Creation, the Fall into sin, and Redemption in Christ.  This Christian religious ground motive is a fundamentally different posture toward things, compared to say, the "Form/Matter" scheme of the Greeks, the "Nature/Grace" synthesis of Medieval Christianity, or the "Nature/Freedom" approach of the Enlightenment, all of which are orientations divided against themselves by their reliance upon two contradictory principles.  While the Christian religious view of things as Created, Fallen and being Redeemed has often been blended with speculative and dualistic schemes, it has never really become fully identified with them, so that there is historical continuity in Christian thought despite the fact that it has undergone numerous significant shifts, in Dooyeweerd's view.  But the fact that they are capable of being blended convincingly exposes the transcendental rules to which both false and true theories are subject.

A religious ground motive is a  spiritual driving force that impels each thinker to interpret reality under its influence.  Dooyeweerd wrote that, in the case of thinkers who presume that human thought is autonomous, who operate by the dictum that it does not matter whether God exists or not, such a thinker's basic commitment to autonomous thought forces him to pick out some aspect of the creation as the origin of all meaning.  In doing so, the supposedly autonomous thinker is made captive to a kind of idol of his own making, which bends his understanding to conform to its dictates, according to Dooyeweerd.

Although he self-consciously exposes the religious nature of his philosophy, Dooyeweerd suggests that in fact, all thought is inescapably religious in character.  This religious stamp is disguised when the supposed origin of meaning, toward which various thinkers direct their thought, is not called God, but is rather said to be some aspect of creation.  This, he suggests, explains why humanistic science will produce bitterly conflicting ideologies. It helps to locate the "antithesis", the source of irreducible differences, between various perspectives.  The "antithesis" must be accounted for as a foundational issue, in any complete philosophy, and this antithesis is religious in nature, according to Dooyeweerd.

Borrowing language and concepts from a wide variety of philosophical schools, especially Edmund Husserl, the Marburg school of neo-Kantianism, Ernst Cassirer's Philosophy of Symbolic Forms—and, as some contend, Franz Xaver von Baader,  Dooyeweerd builds on this foundation of a supposed "antithesis" to make distinctions between one kind of thinking and another, theorizing that diverse kinds of thinking disclose diverse kinds of meaning, and that this meaning corresponds in some way to the actual state of affairs.

Dooyeweerd developed an anti-reductionist ontology of "modal aspects", concerning diverse kinds of meaning which are disclosed in the analysis of every existent thing.  He considered such modes to be irreducible to each other and yet indissolubly linked.  Dooyeweerd at first suggested that there were 14 modes but later postulated 15.  The indissoluble coherence of these modal aspects is evinced through their analogical relationship to one another, and finally in their concentration in the central religious selfhood which has a direct relationship to its origin: God.

The majority of Dooyeweerd's published articles and multi-volume works originally appeared only in Dutch.  During his lifetime efforts were already underway to make his work available to English-speakers.  Translation of Dooyeweerd's writing has continued since 1994 under the oversight of the Dooyeweerd Centre (see link below).  To date, thirteen books have been published in English, including his magnum opus, De Wijsbegeerte der Wetsidee (1935–1936), which was revised and expanded in English as A New Critique of Theoretical Thought (1953–1958).

Dooyeweerd's influence has continued through the Association for Reformational Philosophy and its journal Philosophia Reformata  which he and Vollenhoven founded in 1932.  The title of the journal is something of an arcane philosophical joke, which repristinates and shifts the meaning of the title from a 1622 book, authored by Johann Daniel Mylius, Philosophia Reformata, a compendium of alchemy, then regarded by some as a science.  There are also a number of institutions around the world that draw their inspiration from Dooyeweerd's philosophy.

Dooyeweerd became member of the Royal Netherlands Academy of Arts and Sciences in 1948.

In a commemoration editorial appearing in the newspaper Trouw on 6 October 1964 upon the occasion of Dooyeweerd's 70th birthday, G.E. Langemeijer, chairman of the Royal Dutch Academy of Sciences, professor at the University of Leiden, and appellate attorney general, lauded Dooyeweerd as "... the most original philosopher Holland has ever produced, even Spinoza not excepted."

Bibliography

Multi-volume publications 
 .
Volume II: The General Theory of the Modal Spheres
Volume III: The Structure of Individuality of Temporal Reality
Volume IV: Index of Subject and Authors (compiled by H. de Jongste)
Reformation and Scholasticism in Philosophy
Volume I: The Greek Prelude
Encyclopedia of the Science of Law
Volume 1: Introduction

Collected essays, critiques, and compilations
Christian Philosophy and the Meaning of History
Essays in Legal, Social, and Political Philosophy
Roots of Western Culture
In The Twilight of Western Thought
Political Philosophy
Contours of a Christian Philosophy; An Introduction to Herman Dooyeweerd's Thought

 Notes 

See also
Posthumanism#Philosophical posthumanism
 References 

Studies
 .
 .

A special issue of the journal Axiomathes was devoted to the subject of "Philosophy and Science in the Thought of Herman Dooyeweerd".

 Introductions to Dooyeweerd's Thought 

Kalsbeek, L. (1976). Contours of a Christian Philosophy: An Introduction to Herman Dooyeweerd's Thought, trans. Bernard Zylstra and Josina Zylstra. Toronto: Wedge Publishing Foundation.
 Originally published in Dutch as 
Marcel, Pierre-Charles (2013). The Transcendental Critique of Theoretical Thought, trans. Colin Wright. Volume 1 of The Christian Philosophy of Herman Dooyeweerd. Aalten, Netherlands: Wordbridge Publishing.
Marcel, Pierre-Charles (2013). The General Theory of the Law-Spheres, trans. Colin Wright. Volume 2 of The Christian Philosophy of Herman Dooyeweerd. Aalten, Netherlands: Wordbridge Publishing.
Spier, J.M. (1954). An Introduction to Christian Philosophy, trans. David H. Freeman. Philadelphia: Presbyterian and Reformed Publishing Company.
Originally published in Dutch as 
Strauss, D.F.M. (2015) Herman Dooyeweerd's Philosophy 
Provides a more extensive systematic orientation in Dooyeweerd’s philosophy.

 Influences and Development 
 
 
One of the most controversial articles in the literature on Dooyeweerd's intellectual development, Friesen argues that twenty-five key ideas in Dooyeweerd's writings "can already be found in the nineteenth century German philosopher, Franz von Baader".
 
 
 
 . 
One of the first responses to Friesen (2003), Strauss argues that the idea "there is any direct influence on his [Dooyeweerd's] thought from Von Baader can not be substantiated on the basis of the available sources even though it is not unlikely that he might have been aware of the existence of Von Baader".

External links

  Herman Dooyeweerd's Collected Works online
 .
 .
 .
 .
 .  Koyzis' reworking of Dooyeweerd's modal scale, and Spanish translation of his Introductory Essay to Political Philosophy (2004 publication of the Collected Works of Herman Dooyeweerd'').
 .

1894 births
1977 deaths
20th-century Dutch philosophers
20th-century Dutch writers
Calvinist and Reformed philosophers
Christian continental philosophers and theologians
Critics of atheism
Dutch Christian writers
Members of the Royal Netherlands Academy of Arts and Sciences
Reformed Churches Christians from the Netherlands
Vrije Universiteit Amsterdam alumni
Academic staff of Vrije Universiteit Amsterdam
Writers from Amsterdam